Oe or barred O (Ө ө; italics: Ө ө) is a letter of the Cyrillic script.

Shape

Its form was copied from the Latin letter barred O (Ɵ ɵ) used in Jaꞑalif and other alphabets. Despite having a similar shape, it is related neither to the Greek letter theta (Θ θ/) nor to the archaic Cyrillic letter fita (Ѳ ѳ). However, traditional forms of Cyrillic fita (since the 18th century) and oe are identical, and designers of Unicode's sample font were probably the first ones who split glyphs of the two letters (providing Oe with a horizontal bar and Fita with a tilde-shaped bar inside). In traditional typography, the shape of the inner line depends on typeface, not on meaning of the letter: the bar in both oe and fita may either be straight or wavy.

Usage

Oe is used in the alphabets of the Bashkir, Buryat, Kalmyk, Kazakh, Khanty, Kyrgyz, Tatar, Tuvan, Mongolian, and Yakut languages. In Kazakh, this letter may also express . Recently, the letter has also been adopted in the spelling of the Komi-Yazva language, where it represents a close-mid centralized back unrounded or weakly rounded vowel . The International Phonetic Alphabet uses the identically shaped Latin counterpart, ɵ, to represent the close-mid central rounded vowel, and sometimes also the mid central rounded vowel.

In Tuvan, Kyrgyz and Mongolian the Cyrillic letter can be written as a double vowel.

Computing codes

See also
Ö ö : O with diaeresis - an Azerbaijani, Estonian, Finnish, German, Hungarian, Icelandic, Swedish, Turkish and Turkmen letter.
Ơ ơ : Latin letter O with horn, used in Vietnamese language
Ø ø : Latin letter O with stroke
Õ õ : Latin letter O with tilde, used in Estonian language
Œ œ : Ligature Oe
О о : Cyrillic letter O
Ӧ ӧ : Cyrillic letter O with diaeresis
Ӫ ӫ : Cyrillic letter oe with diaeresis

References

Vowel letters
Tatar language